Sheleph was a son of Joktan, of the family of Shem. (Book of Genesis 10:26).  Sheleph means "drawing out" or "who draws out" (Hitchcock's Bible Dictionary).

Book of Genesis people